Félix Dujardin (5 April 1801 – 8 April 1860) was a French biologist born in Tours. He is remembered for his research on protozoans and other invertebrates.

Biography

In 1840 he was appointed professor of geology and mineralogy at the University of Toulouse, and during the following year was a professor of zoology and botany at Rennes. In regard to his educational background, Dujardin was largely self-taught, the son of a watchmaker.

Dujardin worked with microscopic animal life, and in 1834 proposed that a new group of one-celled organisms be called Rhizopoda. He denied naturalist Christian Gottfried Ehrenberg's theory that microscopic organisms were "complete organisms" similar to higher animals, specifically noting that they had specialized structures unique to single-celled organisms, which meant that foraminifera he was studying was not, as his contemporaries believed it to be, a mollusk. In addition to his studies of microscopic life, he did extensive research on invertebrate groups that included echinoderms, hexapods, helminths and cnidarians.

In the Foraminifera, he noticed an apparently formless life substance that he named "sarcode", later renamed protoplasm by Hugo von Mohl (1805–1872).

Dujardin also remains famous for the identification and the first description in 1850 of the mushroom bodies (corpora pedunculata) in the hymenopteran brain (bee, bumblebee, sphex, ant, fruitfly Drosophila melanogaster, etc.), which he postulated for the first time that they were the site of intelligence. This major discovery will eventually prove to be almost accurate, as these structures are now considered the place where memory and many other behaviors are formed and processed in invertebrates.

Bibliography

 Dujardin F. 1837. Mémoire sur les couches du sol en Touraine et descriptions des coquilles de la craie des faluns .
 Dujardin F. 1841. Histoire naturelle des zoophytes. Infusoires, comprenant la physiologie et la classification de ces animaux, et la manière de les étudier à l'aide du microscope.
 Dujardin F. 1842. Nouveau manuel de l'observateur au microscope.
 Dujardin F. 1845. Histoire naturelle des helminthes ou vers intestinaux. xvi, 654+15 pp. + Plates.
 Dujardin F. 1850. Mémoire sur le système nerveux des insectes. Ann. Sci. Nat. Zool. 14: 195-206.

The standard author abbreviation Dujard is applied to species he described.

References
 Louis Joubin, 1901, Félix Dujardin, 1801-1860. Archives de Parasitologie, Volume 4, 5-60. PDF

External sources
 Félix Dujardin @ Encyclopædia Britannica Online
 article on Felix Dujardin's Contributions to Protistology

French biologists
1801 births
1860 deaths
French parasitologists
Scientists from Tours, France
French zoologists
Academic staff of the University of Toulouse